The 2008 Wokingham Borough Council election took place on 1 May 2008 to elect members of Wokingham Unitary Council in Berkshire, England. One third of the council was up for election and the Conservative Party stayed in overall control of the council.

After the election, the composition of the council was:
Conservative 44
Liberal Democrat 10

Campaign
18 seats were contested in the election with candidates from the Conservatives, Liberal Democrats, Labour, United Kingdom Independence Party, Green Party and British National Party standing. The leader of the council, Conservative councillor Frank Browne, was one of a number of councillors who stood down at the election. The Conservatives were defending 14 seats compared to 4 for the Liberal Democrats.

The Conservatives defended their record in running the council and committed themselves to keeping a weekly bin collection, fight to keep down the number of new houses being built in the council area and continue investing in services. Meanwhile, the Liberal Democrats criticised cuts in adult social care services and school maintenance funds and attacked a lack of democracy over proposed developments. Other issues raised in the election included crime and council tax increases.

Election result
The election saw only one seat change hands with the Conservatives gaining Hillside from the Liberal Democrats to remain in control of the council with 44 of the 54 seats. Hillside ward had seen the former Liberal Democrat councillor, Alan Spratling, step down at the election and he was succeeded by Conservative Pauline Jorgensen, wife of another councillor for Hillside, Norman Jorgensen. The election also saw the United Kingdom Independence Party overtake Labour in the number of votes won across the council to win the third most votes. Overall turnout in the election was 38.23%.

Following the election David Lee was elected as the new leader of the council to replace Frank Browne after he had stood down at the election.

Ward results

References

2008 English local elections
2008
2000s in Berkshire